The Vice President of the Autonomous Region of Bougainville is the second highest office in the province, which is an autonomous region of Papua New Guinea. The current Vice-President is Patrick Nisira, who was sworn in on 25 September 2020 after his appointment by President Ishmael Toroama.

The Vice-President is appointed by the President from among the members of the House of Representatives from one region other than the region from which the President comes from.

List of vice-presidents of the Autonomous Region of Bougainville 

Note: John Tabinaman served as the acting President of the Autonomous Region of Bougainville from June 2008 until 6 January 2009.

References 

Politics of Papua New Guinea
 
Autonomous Region of Bougainville
2005 establishments in Papua New Guinea